Tougan is a department or commune of Sourou Province in north-western Burkina Faso. Its capital is the town of Tougan.

Towns and villages

References

Departments of Burkina Faso
Sourou Province